The 2006 European Swimming Championships were held in Budapest, Hungary, from 26 July – 6 August 2006. Disciplines include swimming, diving, synchronised swimming (synchro) and open water swimming. European Water Polo Championships for 2006 were also organized by LEN, but held separately.

Competition dates by discipline were:
Swimming: 31 July – 6 August
Diving: 1–6 August
Synchro: 26–30 July
Open Water: 26–30 July

Medal table

Swimming

Schedule
Competition dates for Swimming were: 31 July – 6 August. All swimming events contested in a long-course (50m) pool; with morning sessions (preliminary heats) beginning at 09:30, and evening sessions (semifinals and finals) beginning at 17:00. Event format was:
200m and under: prelims/semifinals/finals—preliminary heats and semifinals were held on the same day (morning then evening), with finals of the event on the next evening.
400m and longer: prelims/finals. In the 400m, and the 4 × 100 m and 4 × 200 m relays, prelims and finals were held on the same day. In the women's 800m and men's 1500m events, prelims were held in the morning of day 1 of the event, with finals of the event in the evening session of day 2.

Event order for evening sessions was:

Results

Men's Events

Women's Events

WR= World Record (and by default also new European, Championships and National records for those involved); ER= European Record (and by default also new Championships and National records); CR= Championships Record

Medal table

Diving

Schedule
Competition dates for Diving were: 1–6 August 2006.

Results

Men

Women

Medal table

Synchronized Swimming

Schedule
Competition dates for Synchro were 26–30 July 2006.

Results

Medal table

Open Water Swimming

Schedule
Competition dates for Open Water were 26–30 July 2006.

Results

Men

Women

Medal table

See also
Ligue Européenne de Natation – LEN: the European Swimming League

References

Sources
 Official Budapest 2006 Website
 Swim Rankings Results

E
S
LEN European Aquatics Championships
A
European Aquatics
July 2006 sports events in Europe
August 2006 sports events in Europe
2000s in Budapest